Two/Three is Tadd Mullinix's second studio album under the Dabrye name. It was released by the Ghostly International label on June 13, 2006, around five years after its predecessor One/Three.

The style of Two/Three differs from that album mainly in doubling its length and featuring guest vocal contributions from a number of rappers across fourteen of its twenty tracks. These notably include MF DOOM, Jay Dee and several others associated with the Stones Throw record label, as well as A.G. of the Diggin' in the Crates Crew, Beans of Antipop Consortium and Cannibal Ox's Vast Aire.

Reception

Critical reception to the album was largely positive. AMG critic Andy Kellman describes it as "always moving, almost always stimulating, never stagnating", and in particular singles out "a nine-track patch, from "Jorgy" through "My Life"", which he says "involves an extraordinarily vast array of sounds and lyricists while sacrificing neither flow nor momentum". Alan Ranta of Tiny Mix Tapes praised the album's "mean... [but] not for the sake of being mean" beats, and the cohesion between the music and guest rappers.

Ryan Dombal, writing in Pitchfork Media, disagrees, praising Mullinix's "singular Timbaland-meets-the flipside of Low rumble" as "more focused and intricate than ever", but criticising many of the rappers as "wordy know-it-alls hell-bent on disrupting his groove". He praises Guilty Simpson's appearance as an example of "what Two/Three could be if the rappers were chosen based on entertainment value rather than how hard they're trying to save rap with big words".
See Prefix review, 9/10 :     http://www.prefixmag.com/reviews/dabrye/twothree/15190/

Track listing 
"The Stand" (Tadd Mullinix, Jack Brown) – 3:32
Featuring Wildchild
"Air" (Mullinix, Daniel Dumile) – 3:10
Featuring DOOM
"Machines Pt. I" (Mullinix) – 1:37
"Encoded Flow" (Mullinix, B. Mitchell) – 2:52
Featuring Kadence
"That's What's Up" (Mullinix, Theodore Arrington, Thomas Fehlmann) – 4:03
Featuring Vast Aire
"Tell Dem" (Mullinix) – 3:04
"Nite Eats Day" (Mullinix, Robert Edward Stewart II) – 1:56
Featuring Beans
"Jorgy" (Mullinix, Robert O'Bryant) – 2:54
Featuring Waajeed
"Special" (Mullinix, Byron Simpson, F. Beauregard) – 3:29
Featuring Guilty Simpson and Paradime
"Bloop" (Mullinix) – 1:57
"Viewer Discretion" (Mullinix, D. Cooper, I. Weaver) – 3:00
Featuring Invincible and Finale
"Piano" (Mullinix) – 4:05
"Pressure" (Mullinix, O'Bryant, Terrell McMathis) – 3:20
Featuring Waajeed and Ta'Raach
"Reconsider" (Mullinix, Mitchell) – 3:24
Featuring Kadence
"Get It Together" (Mullinix, Cooper, Weaver) – 3:32
Featuring Invincible and Finale
"My Life" (Mullinix, Andre Barnes) – 2:19
Featuring A.G.
"In Water" (Mullinix) – 1:57
"Get Live" – (Mullinix, Anthony Jackson) 3:37
Featuring Big Tone
"Machines Pt. II" (Mullinix) – 0:39
"Game Over" (Mullinix, Ronnie Watts, James Yancey) – 3:41
Featuring Jay Dee and Phat Kat

References

External links 
 Release information from Ghostly

2006 albums
Dabrye albums
Ghostly International albums